Port Klang is a town and the main gateway by sea into Malaysia. Known during colonial times as Port Swettenham but renamed Port Klang in July 1972, it is the largest port in the country.

Located in the District of Klang, it was the 11th busiest container port (2012) in the world. It was also the 12th busiest port in by volume  (million TEU) in 2018 and the top location of aluminium stock for LME, the top metal exchange in the world.

History
Klang was formerly the terminus of the government railway and the port of the State. In 1880, the state capital of Selangor was moved from Klang to the more strategically advantageous Kuala Lumpur. Rapid development at the new administrative centre in the late 1800s attracted businessmen and job seekers alike from Klang. At this time the only methods of transport between Klang and Kuala Lumpur were by horse or buffalo drawn wagons, or boat ride along the Klang River to Damansara. Due to this Frank Swettenham stated to Selangor's British Resident at the time, William Bloomfield Douglas, that the journey to Kuala Lumpur was "rather long and boring". He continued to suggest a train line be built as an alternative route.

In September 1882, Sir Frank Athelstane Swettenham was appointed Selangor's new Resident. Swettenham initiated a rail link between Klang and Kuala Lumpur to overcome the transport problems particularly of the tin mining interests, who needed to convey the ore to Klang's port, Pelabuhan Batu. Nineteen and a half miles of rail track from Kuala Lumpur to Bukit Kudu was opened in September 1886, and extended 3 miles to Klang in 1890.

. Developed by the Malayan Railway and officially opened 15 years later on 15 September 1901 by Swettenham himself, the new port was named Port Swettenham.

Under British rule

Both Klang and Port Swettenham were already known as notoriously malaria prone localities with the port itself located on a mangrove swamp. Within two months of its opening, the port was closed due to an outbreak of malaria. Just a few years before, the British doctor Sir Ronald Ross proved in 1897 that malaria is transmitted by mosquitoes. Port Swettenham was the first colonial area to benefit from the discovery. Swamps were filled in, jungle cleared, and surface water diverted to destroy mosquito breeding grounds and combat further disruption to port operations. The threat of malaria was removed completely by the end of the exercise. Trade grew rapidly and two new berths were added by 1914 along with other port facilities. The Selangor Polo Club was founded in Port Swettenham in 1902 but it moved to Kuala Lumpur in 1911.

Between World Wars I and II the port experienced much growth and expansion, peaking in 1940 when tonnage rose to 550,000 tonnes. During the Second World War allied aircraft were serviced by RAF Servicing Commandos at airfields in Port Swettenham. Its location is marked on a 1954 map by the United States Army. Much of the port's facilities that were damaged during the war were reconstructed. The port expanded to the south with permanent installations to handle more palm oil and latex, two increasingly important exports. Imports also grew tremendously and tonnage of cargo handled at the port far exceeded what was thought possible before the war.

Post-independence
On 1 July 1963 the Malaysian government established the Port Swettenham Authority, which subsequently was changed to Port Klang Authority as a statutory corporation to take over the administration of Port Klang from the Malayan Railway Administration. In the late 1960s and 1970s new deepwater berths were constructed with wharves suitable for handling container as well as conventional cargoes. The Royal Selangor Yacht Club was first registered here as "Port Swettenham Yacht Club" in July 1969. In November 1972, Prime Minister Tun Abdul Razak declared the container terminal open and in May 1974, construction of seven more berths for bulk cargo began and was completed in 1983. In October 1982, construction of the liquid bulk terminal in North Port was completed.

On 17 March 1986 the container terminal facilities operated by Port Klang Authority was privatised to Klang Container Terminal Berhad as part of the privatisation exercise of the government. In January 1988, construction work began on a new  berth, as an alternative to the immediate development of West Port. A government directive in 1993 has identified Port Klang to be developed into the National Load Centre. Port Klang has since grown and now establishes trade connections with over 120 countries and dealings with more than 500 ports around the world.

The port is part of the Maritime Silk Road that runs from the Chinese coast via the Suez Canal to the Mediterranean, there to the Upper Adriatic region of Trieste with its connections to Central and Eastern Europe.

Local governance

Port Klang Authority
The Port Klang Authority administers three ports in the Port Klang area namely Northport, Southpoint and Westport. Prior to the establishment of the Port Klang Authority, South Port was the only existing port and was administered by the Malayan Railway Administration. Both Westport and Northport have been privatized and managed as separate entities.

The total capacity of the port is 109,700,000 tons of cargo in 2005 compared to 550,000 tons in 1940.

Port operators

Northport
Northport is owned and operated by Northport (Malaysia) Bhd and comprises dedicated multipurpose port facilities and services. The Northport entity was a merger of two companies; Kelang Container Terminal (KCT) and Kelang Port Management (KPM). Its operations also cover South Port, which was renamed Southpoint for conventional cargo handling, and acquired Northport Distripark Sdn Bhd (NDSB) as part of its logistics division.

Westport

Westport is managed by Westports Malaysia Sdn Bhd (formerly known as Kelang Multi Terminal Sdn Bhd). A passenger port, Port Klang Cruise Centre, opened in December 1995 at Pulau Indah which is located next to the cargo terminals of Westport. Cruise line and naval ships drop anchor in any of the three berths at Port Klang Cruise Centre, which was under the management of Star Cruises before being taken over by the Glenn Marine Group.

Accessibility

Car
Port Klang is the western end of the Federal Highway Federal Route 2 that links it all the way to Kuala Lumpur.
The KESAS interchanges with the Pulau Indah Expressway Federal Route 181 in nearby Pandamaran connects to Westports and the PKFZ.

Main roads that link the Port Klang town, Southport and housing area are Persiaran Raja Muda Musa and Jalan Pelabuhan Utara.

Since 2012, Pulau Indah is directly connected to Malaysia's administrative capital, Putrajaya and Kajang via the SKVE .

Public transportation
There is a frequent bus and commuter train service to Kuala Lumpur via Klang.

Port Klang is served by the KTM Komuter service and trains stop at the  Port Klang Komuter station. The electric train service links to Klang, Kuala Lumpur, Subang Jaya, Shah Alam and all the way until Tanjung Malim.

A passenger ferry terminal to Pulau Ketam and an International terminal to Tanjungbalai and Dumai in Indonesia are also located in the area. The old ferry terminal used to serve regular passenger boats to Pulau Lumut and Telok Gonjeng terminal until the completion of Northport Bridge link.

Politics
Port Klang is under the jurisdiction of the Klang Municipal Council (MPK).

Image gallery

See also
 Container transport
 List of East Asian ports
 Operation Zipper
 Port Klang Free Zone

References

External links

Port Klang Authority
Northport (Malaysia) Bhd
Westports Malaysia Sdn Bhd
Port Klang Free Zone
JPN Port Klang

Ports and harbours of Malaysia
Klang District
Towns in Selangor
Populated coastal places in Malaysia
Port cities in Asia
Ports and harbours of the Indian Ocean
Klang River

pl:Kelang